Haplidoeme is a genus of beetles in the family Cerambycidae, containing the following species:

 Haplidoeme punctata Chemsak & Linsley, 1971
 Haplidoeme schlingeri Chemsak & Linsley, 1965

References

Xystrocerini